A tablet, in a religious context, is a term used for certain religious texts.

In the Hebrew Bible

Judaism and Christianity maintain that Moses brought the Ten Commandments down from Mount Sinai in the form of two tablets of stone. According to the Book of Exodus, God delivered the tablets twice, the first set having been smashed by Moses in his anger at the idol-worship of the Israelites.

In Islam
The Preserved Tablet (al-Lawhu 'l-Mahfuz), the heavenly preserved record of all that has happened and will happen, contains qadar. Qadar (transliterated qadar, meaning "fate", "divine fore-ordainment", "predestination") is the concept of divine destiny in Islam.

In the Baháʼí Faith
The term "tablet" is part of the title of many shorter works of Baháʼu'lláh, founder of the Baháʼí Faith, and his son and successor ʻAbdu'l-Bahá.

See also
 Book of Life
 Emerald Tablet
 Tablet of Destinies, a divine tablet of supreme importance in Mesopotamian mythology
 Stele
 World's largest book, a stone book the pages of which are inscribed stone tablets

References

Bahá'í terminology
Islamic texts
Religious texts